Spica was a German fishing trawler that was requistioned by the Kriegsmarine in the Second World War for use as a vorpostenboot, Serving as V 214 Spica and V 804 Spica. She returned to service as a fishing trawler post-war and was scrapped in 1955.

Description
The engine was built by Christiansen & Meyer, Harburg, Germany. It was rated at 62nhp.

History
Spica was built as yard number 244 by Schiffbau-Gesellschaft Unterweser AG, Wesermünde, Germany.  She was launched on 5 November 1930 and completed on 2 December. She was built for the Hochseefischerei Nordstern AG, Wesermünde. The Code Letters KRGN were allocated, as was the fishing boat registration PG 404. In 1934, her Code Letters were changed to DFBS.

On 17 September 1939, Spica was requisitioned by the Kriegsmarine for use as a vorpostenboot. She was allocated to 2 Vorpostenflotille as V 214 Spica. She was reallocated on 21 October to 8 Vorpostenflotille as V 804 Spica.

Post-war she returned to merchant service with her pre-war owners. The fishing boat registration BX 383 was allocated in 1948. She was scrapped in April 1955 by W. Ritscher, Hamburg, West Germany.

References

Sources

1930 ships
Ships built in Bremen (state)
Fishing vessels of Germany
Steamships of Germany
Auxiliary ships of the Kriegsmarine
Steamships of West Germany
Fishing vessels of West Germany